Gandalf Ridge is a volcanic ridge at the northwest end of Hurricane Ridge, to the north of Mount Morning on the Scott Coast of Antarctica. Gandalf is a whimsical name put forward by geologist Philip R. Kyle of the Institute of Polar Studies, Ohio State University, who examined the ridge in December 1977. The discovery of very hard volcanic rock at this ridge led to the naming: Gandalf, after a crusty character (a wizard) in J. R. R. Tolkien's The Lord of the Rings.

References

Ridges of Victoria Land
Scott Coast